The RT-1 was an early intercontinental ballistic missile design that was tested but not deployed by the Soviet Union during the Cold War.  It was not assigned a NATO reporting name, but did carry the GRAU index 8K95.

Development was led by OKB-1 (S. P. Korolev), and a total of nine flight tests were carried out, of which the two first failed, with the last launch taking place in June 1963. Two versions of the RT-1 were developed, with the first failing its first flight, but succeeding in its second in 1961.  A second version was tested in 1965 with three flights, of which two failed.  The RT-1 program was cancelled before any service.

Operators 

   The Strategic Rocket Forces were to operate the RT-1, but the program was cancelled before service entry.

See also 

 List of missiles
 List of rockets

References

Cold War intercontinental ballistic missiles of the Soviet Union
RT-001